Majid Isa Zahi (also Romanized as Majīd ʿĪsá Zahī) is a village in Margan Rural District, in the Central District of Hirmand County, Sistan and Baluchestan Province, Iran. At the 2006 census, its population was 43 from 10 different families.

References 

Populated places in Hirmand County